Abere is a demoness from Melanesian mythology. She is portrayed as a "wild" woman with young female servants. She is said to reside in marshes. She draws people to her by her beauty, entrapping them by causing reeds to grow around them. Once they are trapped, she proceeds to devour her victims.

References

 Rose, Carol. Giants, Monsters, and Dragons. Santa Barbara, CA: ABC-CLIO, 2000. .

External links
 Godchecker.com entry on Abere

Melanesian legendary creatures
Female legendary creatures
Mermaids